"SoulMate" is a song recorded by American singer-songwriter Justin Timberlake. Described as contender for "song of the summer", it was written and produced by Canadian producer Nineteen85 with an additional writing from James Fauntleroy, Timberlake, Brian Casey, Gary Smith, Bert Young and Brandon Casey. Its release coincided with the summer leg of The Man of the Woods Tour.

Credits and personnel
Credits adapted from Tidal.

Justin Timberlake – vocals, composer, lyricist, vocal producer
James Fauntleroy – vocals, composer, lyricist
Paul Jefferies – composer, producer, keyboard, drums
Brian Casey – composer, lyricist
Brandon Casey – composer, lyricist
Gary Smith – composer, lyricist
Bert Young – composer, lyricist
Chris Godbey – mixing engineer, recording engineer
Chris Athens – mastering engineer
Dalton "D-10" Tennant – bass
Elliot Ives – guitar

Charts

References 

2018 songs
2018 singles
Justin Timberlake songs
Songs written by Justin Timberlake
Song recordings produced by Nineteen85
Songs written by James Fauntleroy
Songs written by Nineteen85